Arthur E. Langford Jr. (October 3, 1949 - April 15, 1994) was an Atlanta, Georgia, city councilman and Georgia state senator (1984–1994).  When he was a student as Morris Brown College, Langford worked against drugs and violence in poor neighborhoods, founding the United Youth Adult Conference. Langford was an ordained Baptist minister who served at West Hunter Street Baptist Church as associate minister and Rush Memorial Congregational Church as pastor.

Memorials
In 1995, the Lakewood Freeway was renamed the Arthur Langford Jr. Memorial Parkway in honor of Langford. There is an Arthur Langford Park and a street, Arthur Langford Jr. Place in his old neighborhood, Joyland, in southeastern Atlanta. The United Youth Adult Conference II maintains the Arthur Langford Jr. Teen Leadership Institute.

References

External links
 "SR 45 - Senator Arthur Langford Jr. – regrets at passing", Georgia State Senate, 1995/96 Sessions

1949 births
1994 deaths
Atlanta City Council members
Georgia (U.S. state) state senators
Morris Brown College alumni
20th-century American politicians